Valloire is a commune in the Savoie department in the Auvergne-Rhône-Alpes region in south-eastern France.

The ski resort Valloire-Galibier is located in the commune, at the foot of the Col du Télégraphe and next to the ski resort of Valmeinier, (the alps) France.

70% of the Valloire/Valmeinier ski area is above . It offers over 150 km of slopes, 33 lifts 2 gondolas, 17 chairlift & 14 drag lifts), and 85 slopes, (21 Green, 25 Blue, 31 Red and 6 Black). There is also a considerable amount of backcountry skiing available.

Valloire has two main skiing areas which can be accessed by lifts from the village. They are the Sétaz and the Crey du Quart. From the Crey du Quart you can ski across to Valmeinier, which is included in the ski pass. The Crey du Quart also houses a large snowpark (with a dedicated daily ticket only for this park) which is designed to offer something to people of all skill levels. In the Arva Parc on the Sétaz one can learn how to rescue avalanche victims. The French Foreign Legion has a mountain outpost at Valloire Les Verneys and teaches beginning legionnaires on the slopes. Jaime Salazar dedicated a chapter in his 2005 Foreign Legion memoir Legion of the Lost to the severe mountain course in Valloire.

It is a traditional village known for its après-ski and restaurants. The resort includes two ski schools École du Ski Français, which is the largest ski school company in France and "Ecole du Ski Internationale".

It is ideally located in the Savoie region with good transport links in and out of Modane, Lyon, Geneva and Chambery.

Valloire is known as an art resort. Since 1984, it has been organizing the International Competition of Ice Sculptures and Snow Sculptures around January 18 each year.
The resort located at the foot of the mythical Col du Galibier is also an essential part of the Tour de France: stage town on 3 occasions (1972, 1975 and 2019) and arrival in 2011 at the top of the Col du Galibier;

History 
During the early 1930s, Valloire was a simple village, void of tourism. In 1935–36, the first ski club arrived; "Le Ski club de Paris". New hotels and an ice skating rink were opened. In the next two years, Valloire constructed its first ski lift. By 1945, it had added another 5 lifts. In 1970 Valloire expanded from the Sétaz and began developing the Crey du Quart. Four years later, Valloire and Valmeinier joined together to form one ski resort.

In 1989 the first snow cannons were unveiled, allowing for a more lengthy tourism season. Similar progress was made until 2007, when Valloire switched from conventional ski passes to "hands-free" ones, imbedded with a chip. Valloire has recently gained fame as the home of Jean-Baptiste Grange, a slalom World Cup winner.

Geography

Climate

Valloire has a humid continental climate (Köppen climate classification Dfb) closely bordering on a oceanic climate (Cfb).

See also
Communes of the Savoie department

References

External links

Official site
independent community website
local association for the protection of the environment

Communes of Savoie
Tourist attractions in Savoie
Ski areas and resorts in France